Desfontaines is a surname. Notable people with the surname include:

 François-Georges Fouques Deshayes (known as Desfontaines-Lavallée or Desfontaines, 1733-1825), French writer and playwright.
 Henri Desfontaines (1876-1931), French film director, actor and scriptwriter
 Jean Desfontaines (c. 1658–1752), French Baroque composer
 Pierre Desfontaines (1685-1745), French journalist
 René Louiche Desfontaines (1750-1833), French botanist